Julius Levi Strong (November 8, 1828 – September 7, 1872) was an American politician from Connecticut who served as a Republican member of the United States House of Representatives from 1869 to 1872.

Early life and education
Strong was born in Bolton, Connecticut. He attended Wesleyan University in Middletown, Connecticut for one year before transferring to Union College in Schenectady, New York. He left Union college in 1852 to study law at State and National Law School in Ballston Spa, New York.

Career
He served as member of the Connecticut House of Representatives in 1852 and the Connecticut Senate in 1853.  He read law under Martin Welles and was admitted to the bar in 1853 and commenced practice in Hartford, Connecticut.  He served as a member of the State house of representatives for a second time in 1855. He served as prosecuting attorney in 1864 and 1865. He served as president of the common council.

Strong was elected as a Republican to the Forty-first and Forty-second Congresses and served from March 4, 1869, until his death in Hartford, Connecticut on September 7, 1872.

He was interred in Cedar Hill Cemetery.

See also

List of United States Congress members who died in office (1790–1899)

Footnotes

References

External links
 Julius Levi Strong entry at The Political Graveyard
 

1828 births
1872 deaths
19th-century American politicians
Burials at Cedar Hill Cemetery (Hartford, Connecticut)
Connecticut lawyers
Republican Party Connecticut state senators
Republican Party members of the Connecticut House of Representatives
People from Bolton, Connecticut
Republican Party members of the United States House of Representatives from Connecticut
State and National Law School alumni
Union College (New York) alumni
Wesleyan University alumni
19th-century American lawyers